Seeleys Cove is a Canadian unincorporated community in Charlotte County, New Brunswick.

History
Seeleys Cove is named after Justus Seelye, a Loyalist from Connecticut who had served with the King's American Dragoons on Long Island. Seelye moved to the area with his wife and four sons in 1783. He was a descendant of Robert Seeley, one of the original Puritan settlers of Massachusetts.

Notable people

See also
List of communities in New Brunswick

References

Communities in Charlotte County, New Brunswick